Święta Katarzyna railway station is a station in Święta Katarzyna, Lower Silesian Voivodeship, Poland.

The Święta Katarzyna - Wrocław Kuźniki railway line (349), serving as the railway bypass of Wrocław, begins at Święta Katarzyna railway station. The railway station underwent extensive renovation in 2006, when outlying and unused buildings were deconstructed, including a spur towards Oława, whilst the westerly track heading towards Wrocław Brochów was moved to accommodate the construction of a new platform, for passengers heading to the aforesaid railway station.

Connections 

132 Bytom - Wrocław Główny
349 Święta Katarzyna - Wrocław Kuźniki

Train Services

The station is served by the following service(s):

Regional services (PR) Wrocław Główny - Oława - Brzeg
Regional services (PR) Wrocław Główny - Oława - Brzeg - Nysa
Regional service (PR) Wrocław - Oława - Brzeg - Nysa - Kędzierzyn-Koźle
Regional services (PR) Wrocław Główny - Oława - Brzeg - Opole Główne
Regional service (PR) Wrocław - Oława - Brzeg - Opole Główne - Kędzierzyn-Koźle
Regional service (PR) Wrocław - Oława - Brzeg - Opole Główne - Kędzierzyn-Koźle - Racibórz
Regional service (PR) Wrocław - Oława - Brzeg - Opole Główne - Gliwice

References 

Wrocław County
Railway stations in Lower Silesian Voivodeship
Railway stations in Poland opened in 1842